Hop High is the debut album of progressive bluegrass group Crooked Still. Most of the songs on this album are traditional, but played in a different way than by other artists - with lineup without traditional bluegrass instruments like guitar and mandolin, consisting of cello, bass and banjo only (occasionally adding guitar and fiddle).

Track listing
 "Darling Corey" (trad.) 3:42
 "Angeline the Baker" (trad.) 4:13
 "Last Fair Deal Gone Down" (Robert Johnson) 4:29
 "Orphan Girl" (Welch) 2:40
 "Lonesome Road" (trad.) 3:18
 "Old Virginia" (trad.) 4:04
 "Flora" (trad.) 4:05
 "Look On and Cry" (trad.) 3:40
 "Lulu Gal" (trad.) 2:41
 "Rank Stranger" (Brumley) 3:47
 "Shady Grove" (trad.) 4:30

Personnel 
 Aoife O'Donovan - vocals
 Gregory Liszt - banjo
 Rushad Eggleston - violoncello, vocals
 Corey DiMario - upright bass
 Brittany Haas - 5-string violin

References 

2004 debut albums
Crooked Still albums